WSM may refer to:

WSM, international airport code for Wisman Aviation
WSM (AM), a radio station (650 AM) licensed to Nashville, Tennessee, United States
WSM-FM, a radio station (95.5 FM) licensed to Nashville, Tennessee, United States
WSMV-TV, Nashville, Tennessee, US television station, former callsign WSM-TV
Warner Strategic Marketing, part  of the Warner Music Group
Web-based System Manager, IBM management software
Weighted sum model, for decision analysis
Weston-super-Mare railway station, England, station code
Winchester Short Magnum, a family of rifle cartridges
Workers Solidarity Movement, Ireland
World Socialist Movement
World's Strongest Man competition
Samoa ISO 3166-1 country code
WSM Music Group Ltd., Hong Kong
W. Somerset Maugham, English playwright